The County of Newcastle is a county (a cadastral division) in the Wide Bay–Burnett region of Queensland, Australia. On 7 March 1901, the Governor issued a proclamation legally dividing Queensland into counties under the Land Act 1897. Its schedule described Newcastle thus:

Parishes
Newcastle is divided into parishes, as listed below:

References

External links 

 

Newcastle